The Tallangatta Football Netball Club, nicknamed the Hoppers, is an Australian rules football and netball club based in Tallangatta, Victoria playing in the Tallangatta & District Football League (TDFL) & is also a founding member club of the League.

History
The Tallangatta Football Club was formed in 1886 and was one of the founding Clubs of the Tallangatta and District Football League in 1945.

In 1978 The Tallangatta and Bullioh football clubs merged to become the Tallangatta Valley Football Club, although they dropped the word "Valley" in 2009, no longer recognizing their connection to the Bullioh Valley FC when the Bullioh FNC  reformed and joined the Upper Murray Football League.

The club supports 5 football teams, 3 which are junior sides (under 12's, 14's & 17's) and 5 netball teams, again 3 of the teams are junior sides (under 13's, 15's & 18's). The club has been successful in winning a number of Premierships throughout most grades in the past few years.

The club is very committed in supporting and developing juniors.

The Tallangatta Football Netball Club has a very long and proud history and with ongoing improvements and community support the club will continue to be successful in the future.

In round 6 of the 2015 season Tallangatta broke the league record of "Highest Score" in a match. Tallangatta scored 49.23 (317) to defeat the Wodonga Saints 2.5 (17) at Bethanga. Breaking the 1975 record held by Kiewa-Sandy Creek 45.30 (300) defeating Mt Beauty 0.1 (1).

Football Premierships
Seniors
Craven Trophy
 1893 
 Mitta Mitta Football Association (Crawford Cup)
1906
Kiewa & District Football Association
1920 - Tallangatta: 7.13 - 55 defeated Kiewa: 2.4 - 16
 Tallangatta & District Football Association
1922 - Tallangatta: 9.8 - 62 defeated Bethanga: 3.5 - 23
1925 - Tallangatta: 13.10 - 88 defeated Allan's Flat: 8.9 - 57
Dederang & District Football Association
1939 - Tallangatta: 6.12 - 48 defeated Kiewa: 2.9 - 21
Tallangatta & District Football League ( Tallangatta Magpies: 1945-1977)
1945 - Tallangatta: 4 7 31 defeated Fernvale: 2 9 21
1949 - Tallangatta: 8 8 56 defeated Bullioh Valley: 7 6 48
1954 - Tallangatta: 13 13 91 defeated Kiewa: 8 9 57
1974 - Tallangatta: 10 9 69 defeated Lavington: 9 10 64
Tallangatta & District Football League ( Tallangatta Valley Hoppers /  Tallangatta Hoppers: 1978–present)
1979 Tallangatta Valley 12 15 87 Defeated Kiewa Sandy Creek 10 7 67
1980 Tallangatta Valley 20 10 130 Defeated Wodonga Demons 13 11 89
1989 Tallangatta Valley 13 13 91 Defeated Holbrook 8 12 60
1994 Tallangatta Valley 19 17 131 Defeated Kiewa Sandy Creek 10 18 78
1997 Tallangatta Valley 15 10 100 Defeated Mitta United 7 15 57
1998 Tallangatta Valley 10 16 76 Defeated Dederang Mt Beauty 4 4 28
2009 Tallangatta 13 10 88 Defeated Beechworth 8 15 63
2015 Tallangatta 10 8 68 Drew with Kiewa Sandy Creek 8 20 68
2015 - After Extra Time: Tallangatta 11 10 76 Defeated Kiewa Sandy Creek 9 21 75

References

External links
 
 Gameday website
 1940 Kiewa & Mitta Football League Runners Up: Tallangatta FL team photo

Australian rules football clubs in Victoria (Australia)